Amerikamura (also America mura; アメリカ村, American Village) is a sizable retail and entertainment area near Shinsaibashi in the Chūō-ku district of Osaka, Japan. It is usually referred to by locals as "Ame-mura". Amerikamura is an area stretching from Nagahori Street to Dotombori, located in the west side of the Shinsaibashi station.

Amerikamura is identifiable by a small-scale reproduction of the Statue of Liberty that peers down on the streets. It is a well-known haunt of expatriates, and centres on Triangle Park, a concrete rest area surrounded by retail outlets of Western fashions, bars and nightclubs, some of which are run by Westerners.

Its reputation as a hangout for foreigners is a matter of degree. Osaka's registered foreign population is a small fraction of the total population; the makeup of the crowds and retail space in Ame-mura is predominantly Japanese. Locally, Ame-mura is known for being a place for observing some of the more "fashion intense" manifestations of Japanese pop culture.

In 1983, the "Peace on Earth" mural was painted in Amerikamura by artist Seitaro Kuroda.

References

External links 
 AMERICA MURA INFORMATION by AMERICAmura Association
 Happy Jappy Travel Guide - Amerikamura 

Chūō-ku, Osaka
Tourist attractions in Osaka
Shopping districts and streets in Japan
Geography of Osaka